Tetramethylthiuram sulfide is an organosulfur compound with the formula ((CH3)2NCS)2S. It is a yellow solid that is soluble in organic solvents.  It is the parent member of a large class of tetraalkylthiuram sulfides. It is used as an activator in the sulfur vulcanization of natural and butyl rubbers.

Synthesis and structure
It is prepared by desulfuration of tetramethylthiuram disulfides with triphenylphosphine or cyanide:
(Me2NCSS)2 + PPh3 → (Me2NCS)2S + SPPh3

According to X-ray crystallography, the molecule consists of two planar (CH3)2NCS subunits joined by a sulfide. The dihedral angle between the subunits is close to 90°.

References

Organosulfur compounds